The New Caledonia national badminton team represents New Caledonia, an overseas collectivity of France, in international badminton team competitions. New Caledonia has competed in the Sudirman Cup once, which was in 2017, where the team was placed in Group 3A.

New Caledonia has reached many semifinals at the Oceania Badminton Championships. The men's team finished in third place in 2010 and 2012. The women's team have won bronze since 2010. The mixed team won bronze in 1999, 2008, 2014 and 2019. The New Caledonian team also competes in the Pacific Mini Games. They were runners-up at the 2022 Pacific Mini Games.

Participation in BWF competitions

Sudirman Cup

Participation in Oceania Badminton Championships

Men's team

Women's team

Mixed team
{| class="wikitable"
|-
! Year !! Result
|-
| 1999 ||  Third place
|-
|style="border: 3px solid red"| 2008 ||  Third place
|-
| 2012 || Fourth place
|-
| 2014 ||  Third place
|-
| 2016 || Fourth place
|-
| 2019 ||  Third place
|-
| 2023 ||  Third place
|}

Participation in Pacific Mini GamesMixed team'''

Current squad 
The following players were selected to represent New Caledonia at the 2022 Pacific Mini Games.

Male players
Yohan De Geoffroy
Lucas Juillot
Carl N'Guela

Female players
Johanna Kou
Marine Naveros
Marine Souviat

References

Badminton
National badminton teams
Badminton in New Caledonia